Kayathar / Kayatharu is a panchayat town in Thoothukudi district in the Indian state of Tamil Nadu.

Etymology 

Kayathar / Kayatharu means "bitter river", from Aaru (Tamil for river) and kayarpu/kasappu (Tamil for bitter). This name may refer to the river flowing through the town and was attributed to Sri Kodhandaramar who always wore a thulasi malai (in English "basil garland" which has a bitter taste) and whose temple is located on the banks of the river. Arulmigu Kothandarameswarar Temple located here is one of the oldest temples in Thoothukudi district.

History 

The last Pandiya King, Marthanda Varman, fought and lost to the Nayakar Dynasty at Kayathar.

The local chief Veerapandiya Kattabomman, whose fort was located near Kayathar (Panchalan kurichi), was hanged by the British in this place. A statue commemorating him was built in Kayathar by Tamil cinema actor Sivaji Ganeshan.

The poet Kalamega Kavi came to Kayathar and was hungry but didn't get any food in the Perumal temple. He was forced to carry Lord Perumal statue and was frustrated by his hunger. He sang poems to destroy the Perumal temple. After much decay it has been rebuilt in 2009.

The patriotic and revolutionary poet Mundasu Kavi Thiru Bharathiyaar was born near Kayathar (Ettayapuram).

Geography

It is situated along National Highway 7 (NH7) between Tirunelveli and Kovilpatti.

Veerapandiya Kattabomman, one of the earliest opponents of British rule in India (in the first Polygar War), was hanged here on a Tamarind tree, by the British in 1799. A memorial to him has been built here by the Tamil Nadu government.

Conservation  
Kutti Kulam: The water harvesting area. The rain water is saved in this pool for agricultural usage.

Demographics

Population 
 India census, Kayatharu had a population of 9497. Males constitute 50% of the population and females 50%. Kayatharu has an average literacy rate of 66%, higher than the national average of 59.5%: male literacy is 74%, and female literacy is 57%. In Kayatharu, 10% of the population is under 6 years of age.

Religion 

Hinduism, Christianity and Muslim. The city has temples, churches and mosque.

Economy 
Mat production is a huge industry. The area is famous for heavy winds so it has windmills.

The city has a weekly market, held every Thursday. There is an exclusive area for the functioning of this market. Several goods from cooking items to animals are sold here.  Kayathar is the center for marketing many agricultural things for the farmers around ~50 villages.

Education 
Veera Pandia Kattabomman Govt. Hr. Sec. School. The school is named after the Veerapandiya Kattabomman. He was remembered for his activism against the British. The school is located midst farm fields. And BABA MARTIC CULATION HR.SEC.SCHOOL for financially settled people for English medium.

Sports  
Several cultural and sports events are arranged by the youngsters during the Pongal festival (14-20 January). The Kabadi game conducted is the most famous among those. More than 20 teams from nearby villages are participating every year.

References 

Cities and towns in Thoothukudi district